Robert Frederick Langas (January 22, 1930 – January 16, 2021) was an American football end who played for the Baltimore Colts. He played college football at Wayne State University, having previously attended Cooley High School in Detroit, Michigan.

References

1930 births
2021 deaths
American football defensive ends
Wayne State Warriors football players
Baltimore Colts players
Players of American football from Detroit
Cooley High School alumni